Olesya Valentinovna Shmagun (born 21 August 1987) is a Russian investigative journalist. She worked for the Russian newspaper Novaya Gazeta and the Organized Crime and Corruption Reporting Project (OCCRP). Shmagun is one of the founders of the iStories media outlet.

Education 
Olesya Shmagun was born on 21 August 1987. In 2012, she graduated from the MSU Faculty of Journalism. From 2012 to 2015, Shmagun studied full-time postgraduate studies at Moscow State University and on 23 June 2017 she received her Candidate of Philological Sciences degree. The topic of her doctoral thesis was "Small" newspaper  in the period between the two revolutions of 1917.

Career 
Shmagun has worked as a journalist for various organisations, including AvtoRadio, Vzglyad and Izvestia. She also worked for two year for  outlet. In 2013 and 2014, she worked as a curator at the Moscow City Library Centre, which was engaged in the development of libraries in Moscow. Since the summer of 2015, she has been working at the Organized Crime and Corruption Reporting Project.

On 30 April 2020, it became known that Russian journalist Roman Anin and Olesya Shmagun are launching the  investigative journalism outlet. In January 2021, Shmagun left the outlet.

On 20 August 2021, Shmagun was included in the list of persons performing the functions of "foreign agents" in Russia.

Awards 
In 2016, Olesya Shmagun received the Investigative Reporters and Editors Prize for Khadija Project, investigating the corruption of Azerbaijan's ruling family.

She was awarded the Redkollegia journalism award four times, in 2017, 2018, 2019 and 2020.

In 2017, Shmagun received the Pulitzer Prize for Explanatory Reporting as a member of the International Consortium of Investigative Journalists group. She and her colleagues worked on the Panama Papers archive. Their investigation was published in Novaya Gazeta.

In 2020, she received Sigma Award in the Best data-driven reporting category.

In 2021, Shmagun received the European Press Prize Investigative Reporting Award for an article "Kirill and Katya: Love, offshores, and administrative resources. How marrying Putin's daughter gave Kirill Shamalov a world of opportunity". The article described the results of an investigation into the ex-husband of the daughter of Russian president Vladimir Putin.

References

External links 

 How Russian officials privatised the oldest international organisation in Geneva - investigation by Olesya Shmagun

1987 births
21st-century journalists
Living people
Moscow State University alumni
Novaya Gazeta
People listed in Russia as media foreign agents
Pulitzer Prize for Explanatory Journalism winners
Russian investigative journalists
Redkollegia award winners
Russian reporters and correspondents